Agrionoptera insignis allogenes known as the red swampdragon is a subspecies of dragonfly in the family Libellulidae.
It is found in Australia, New Guinea, the Solomon Islands and possibly New Caledonia.

The usual habitat of Agrionoptera insignis allogenes is in the vicinity of shaded ponds, creeks and swamps. It is of medium size (wingspan 70mm, length 40mm), with prominent yellow and black markings on its synthorax, and a reddish or orange abdomen with a black tip. The frons is a bright metallic green. Its range in Australia is from the top end of the Northern Territory, across northern Australia to midway down the east coast of New South Wales.
The species has not yet been assessed in the IUCN Red List, but is listed in the Catalog of Life

Gallery

See also
 List of Odonata species of Australia

References

Libellulidae
Odonata of Oceania
Odonata of Australia
Insects of Australia
Insects of New Guinea
Insects of New Caledonia
Taxa named by Robert John Tillyard
Insects described in 1908